Jeff Celentano (born May 24, 1960) is an American actor, screenwriter, producer and film director. Celentano starred as an actor in such films as The Player, American Ninja 2: The Confrontation, Puppet Master II, and Demonic Toys.

In 1992, he turned to directing with his first short film, Dickwad. Which won several film festivals as best comedy short.  Celentano is an acting teacher and is the Executive Director of Drama at The Performer's Academy in Lake Forest, California.

Filmography (director)

1994 – Dickwad
1995 – Under The Hula Moon
1998 – Gunshy
2000 – Primary Suspect
2004 – Moscow Heat
2007 – Say It in Russian
2009 – Breaking Point
2018 –   Glass Jaw'
2023 – The Hill''

References

External links
Official Site

1960 births
Male actors from New Jersey
American male film actors
American male screenwriters
Drama teachers
Living people
People from Pemberton, New Jersey
Film directors from New Jersey
Screenwriters from New Jersey